L(2, 1)-coloring is a particular case of L(h, k)-coloring. In an L(2, 1)-coloring of a graph, G, the vertices of G are assigned color numbers in such a way that adjacent vertices get labels that differ by at least two, and the vertices that are at a distance of two from each other get labels that differ by at least one.

An L(2,1)-coloring is a proper coloring, since adjacent vertices are assigned distinct colors.

References

Graph coloring